Elwood High School can refer to:

Elwood High School (Kansas) in Elwood, Kansas
Elwood High School (Nebraska) in Elwood, Nebraska
Elwood High School (Australia) former name of Elwood College in Australia
Elwood High School (Newfoundland and Labrador) in Canada